Kevin Jermaine Ollie (born December 27, 1972) is an American basketball coach and former player. Kevin is the head coach for Overtime Elite, a professional basketball league co-founded by Dan Porter and Zack Weiner for top players between 16 and 20 years old, founded in 2021.

He is the former head coach of the University of Connecticut men's basketball team and only one of four African American coaches to ever win an NCAA Men's Basketball Championship. Ollie graduated from Connecticut in 1995 with a degree in Communications. He played for twelve National Basketball Association franchises, most prominently in three stints with the Philadelphia 76ers, in thirteen seasons from 1997 to 2010 after beginning his career with the CBA in 1995.

After retiring from professional basketball in 2010, Ollie joined UConn as an assistant coach; in 2012 he was promoted to head coach following the retirement of Jim Calhoun (who coached Ollie when he was a player). In his second year as Huskies head coach, they won the 2014 NCAA Men's Division I Basketball Tournament.

Early life
Ollie was born in Dallas, Texas to parents Fletcher and Dorothy Ollie and grew up in the rough neighborhood of South Central Los Angeles. When Ollie was 7, his parents divorced and his father moved to Dallas. He spent summers there, cutting lawns and doing other odd jobs so he could be with him for some length of time. His mother, a school teacher and ordained minister, raised him and his older sisters, Vita and Rhonda, by herself.

Playing career

Ollie attended and played basketball at Crenshaw High School in Los Angeles, California. He then starred for four seasons (1991–95) at the University of Connecticut. After his college graduation, he joined the Connecticut Pride of the Continental Basketball Association, playing with them from 1995 to 1997. After that, he began playing in the NBA.

The Minnesota Timberwolves made Ollie their captain during the 2008–09 season. He was then signed by the Oklahoma City Thunder on August 1, 2009 for the veteran's minimum. After the season Ollie retired to join the Connecticut Huskies as an assistant coach.

NBA player Kevin Durant in an interview with Grantland said that Kevin Ollie (who played for Oklahoma City Thunder in 2009-2010) "taught him the ropes", and "changed the culture of Oklahoma City".  He also said, “Kevin Ollie, he was a game changer for us. I think he changed the whole culture in Oklahoma City. Just his mind set, professionalism, every single day. And we all watched that, and we all wanted to be like that. It rubbed off on Russell Westbrook, myself, Jeff Green, James Harden. And then everybody who comes through now, it’s the standard that you’ve got to live up to as a Thunder player. And it all started with Kevin Ollie.”

Ollie had previously played a similar role with the Cleveland Cavaliers. Jim Paxson, Cavaliers GM at the time, recalled his motivation for signing Ollie: "We thought he could come in and be a bridge for us at the point guard position," Paxson recalled, "and also be a good influence on our younger players, the primary one being LeBron James." Paxson cited Ollie's "professionalism and approach to the game" as qualities the team valued.

Coaching career
In 2012, Ollie was named the head basketball coach at Connecticut, replacing longtime hall of fame coach Jim Calhoun. During his college career, Ollie had played under Calhoun. He also served as an assistant coach for Calhoun's final two seasons at UConn. As an assistant coach in 2011, Ollie helped guide the Huskies to a record 11 straight postseason wins which included winning 5 games in 5 nights to win the Big East tournament Championship and winning the 2011 NCAA Men's Basketball Championship. On December 29, 2012, UConn and Ollie agreed to a five-year deal.

The Huskies ended their first season under Ollie 20-10 overall and 8th in Big East play (10-8). The team was ineligible for postseason play because of an NCAA ban resulting from a low APR score several seasons prior.

On December 2, 2013 the Huskies defeated Florida, after which they were ranked #9. The Huskies finished 3rd in the AAC, and defeated Memphis and Cincinnati until losing to Louisville in the AAC Championship game. Connecticut earned an at-large bid to the NCAA tournament with a #7 seed, and defeated #10-seeded Saint Joseph's, #2-seeded Villanova, #3-seeded Iowa State, and #4-seeded Michigan State to become the first #7 seed to reach the Final Four since the tournament expanded in 1985.

On April 5, 2014, the Huskies defeated top-ranked Florida in the First Final Four national semifinal of the NCAA Tournament 63–53. The Huskies then defeated the Kentucky Wildcats 60–54 in the championship game on April 7 for Connecticut's fourth NCAA men's championship in fifteen years.

On May 22, 2014, Ollie signed a new five-year contract with UConn, worth $2.8 million per year.  He was fired with just cause on March 10, 2018 due to an investigation by the NCAA which lead to a three-year show cause order from the NCAA for violations that took place over a four-year period ending in 2017.  Ollie was charged with “failure to monitor” his program and not promoting an atmosphere of compliance.  Connecticut also lost one scholarship for the 2019-2020 class, was put on two years’ probation, was fined $5,000 and will receive various minor recruiting restrictions. The team will also have to vacate victories in which an ineligible player participated during the 2016–17 and 2017–18 season. Ollie was charged with three Level I violations stemming from the following: summer pick-up games that should have counted toward allowable team activities, a video coordinator engaging in impermissible coaching instruction and a booster providing extra benefits to student-athletes. The extra benefits were provided by a private trainer and included training, lodging, meals and local transportation. Ollie, 46, filed a grievance following his firing, seeking to get $10 million in back pay. The dispute has since gone to arbitration.

Should a school have sought to hire Ollie before the NCAA his show-cause order expired on July 2, 2022, it would have had to meet before the NCAA committee on infractions to justify the move. Ollie filed a claim under the University's grievance process, alleging disparate treatment due as his predecessor was retained despite committing NCAA violations. UConn then refused to continue with the contractual grievance process when Ollie filed a separate claim through the courts. As of February 2019, Ollie and UConn administration are in arbitration related to his filing of the original grievance. On January 20, 2022, an arbitrator ruled that UConn improperly fired Ollie and ordered the university to pay him back pay.

On April 12, 2021, Overtime Elite announced Ollie's hiring as head of coaching and basketball development.

Awards and honors
In 2014 ESPN did a series on the Top 50 college hoops coaches—the best NCAA men's basketball coaches right now. Ollie was tenth best on the list. Although he was only in his second year of coaching, he started with a team subject to sanctions, unable to compete in the NCAA tournament, and still managed to complete the season with a 20–10 record, and followed that with a National Championship.

Personal life
Ollie is a Christian. During his NBA career, Ollie was actively involved with the Fellowship of Christian Athletes. Ollie's FCA chaplain stated, "There are very few guys in the NBA who are really sold out to the Lord like Kevin."

Ollie and his ex-wife, Stephanie, have two children: son Jalen and daughter Cheyenne. Stephanie Ollie filed for divorce in January 2015.

NBA career statistics

Regular season

|-
| align="left" | 
| align="left" | Orlando
| 19 || 0 || 11.4 || .411 || .000 || .689 || .9 || 1.7 || .4 || .0 || 4.1
|-
| align="left" | 
| align="left" | Sacramento
| 7 || 0 || 9.7 || .308 || .000 || .800 || .9 || .4 || .4 || .1 || 1.7
|-
| align="left" | 
| align="left" | Orlando
| 1 || 0 || 4.0 || .000 || .000 || .500 || 1.0 || .0 || .0 || .0 || 1.0
|-
| align="left" | 
| align="left" | Philadelphia
| 40 || 0 || 7.3 || .449 || .000 || .757 || .8 || 1.2 || .3 || .0 || 1.8
|-
| align="left" | 
| align="left" | New Jersey
| 19 || 0 || 8.5 || .185 || .000 || .632 || 1.2 || 1.3 || .3 || .0 || 1.2
|-
| align="left" | 
| align="left" | Philadelphia
| 51 || 4 || 15.0 || .430 || .333 || .729 || 1.4 || 2.4 || .5 || .0 || 3.8
|-
| align="left" | 
| align="left" | Chicago
| 52 || 17 || 22.0 || .383 || .500 || .838 || 2.5 || 3.7 || .7 || .0 || 5.8
|-
| align="left" | 
| align="left" | Indiana
| 29 || 0 || 19.9 || .400 || .000 || .804 || 1.9 || 3.4 || .9 || .0 || 5.4
|-
| align="left" | 
| align="left" | Milwaukee
| 53 || 4 || 21.3 || .459 || .200 || .747 || 1.9 || 3.4 || .7 || .1 || 5.7
|-
| align="left" | 
| align="left" | Seattle
| 29 || 1 || 26.6 || .441 || 1.000 || .759 || 2.9 || 3.8 || 1.1 || .0 || 8.0
|-
| align="left" | 
| align="left" | Cleveland
| 82 || 7 || 17.1 || .370 || .444 || .835 || 2.1 || 2.9 || .6 || .1 || 4.2
|-
| align="left" | 
| align="left" | Philadelphia
| 26 || 0 || 6.1 || .355 || .000 || .667 || .7 || .7 || .2 || .0 || 1.1
|-
| align="left" | 
| align="left" | Philadelphia
| 70 || 23 || 15.3 || .431 || .333 || .837 || 1.4 || 1.4 || .5 || .0 || 2.7
|-
| align="left" | 
| align="left" | Philadelphia
| 53 || 23 || 17.3 || .433 || .100 || .822 || 1.4 || 2.5 || .4 || .0 || 3.8
|-
| align="left" | 
| align="left" | Philadelphia
| 40 || 0 || 7.5 || .420 || .000 || .800 || .5 || 1.0 || .3 || .0 || 1.8
|-
| align="left" | 
| align="left" | Minnesota
| 50 || 21 || 17.0 || .407 || .000 || .833 || 1.5 || 2.3 || .4 || .1 || 4.0
|-
| align="left" | 
| align="left" | Oklahoma City
| 25 || 0 || 10.5 || .400 || .000 ||1.000|| 1.0 || 0.8 || .4 || .0 ||1.8
|- class="sortbottom"
| style="text-align:center;" colspan="2"| Career
| 662 || 100 || 15.6 || .410 || .310 || .792 || 1.5 || 2.3 || .5 || .0 || 3.8

Playoffs

|-
| align="left" | 2000
| align="left" | Philadelphia
| 10 || 0 || 6.5 || .500 || .000 || .889 || .5 || 1.2 || .2 || .0 || 2.0
|-
| align="left" | 2001
| align="left" | Philadelphia
| 23 || 0 || 5.3 || .370 || .000 || .929 || .4 || 1.0 || .0 || .0 || 1.4
|-
| align="left" | 2002
| align="left" | Indiana
| 5 || 0 || 23.6 || .423 || .500 || 1.000 || 2.4 || 4.6 || .6 || .0 || 5.8
|-
| align="left" | 2008
| align="left" | Philadelphia
| 3 || 0 || 6.3 || .250 || .000 || 1.000 || .3 || 1.0 || .7 || .0 || 1.3
|-
| align="left" | 2010
| align="left" | Oklahoma City
| 1 || 0 || 5.0 || .000 || .000 || .000 || .0 || .0 || .0  || .0  || .0
|- class="sortbottom"
| style="text-align:center;" colspan="2"| Career
| 42 || 0 || 7.9 || .406 || .500 || .935 || .7 || 1.5 || .2 || .0 || 2.1

Head coaching record
Ollie's victories from the 2016–17 and 2017–18 seasons have been vacated.

See also
 List of NCAA Division I Men's Final Four appearances by coach

References

External links
 Connecticut profile
 NBA profile

1972 births
Living people
African-American basketball coaches
African-American basketball players
African-American Christians
American men's basketball coaches
American men's basketball players
Basketball coaches from California
Basketball players from Los Angeles
Chicago Bulls players
Cleveland Cavaliers players
College men's basketball head coaches in the United States
Connecticut Pride players
Crenshaw High School alumni
Dallas Mavericks players
Indiana Pacers players
Milwaukee Bucks players
Minnesota Timberwolves players
New Jersey Nets players
Oklahoma City Thunder players
Orlando Magic players
Philadelphia 76ers players
Point guards
Sacramento Kings players
Seattle SuperSonics players
UConn Huskies men's basketball coaches
UConn Huskies men's basketball players
Undrafted National Basketball Association players
21st-century African-American sportspeople
20th-century African-American sportspeople